George Lewis McCarty (November 17, 1888 – June 9, 1930) was a professional baseball player who was a catcher from 1913 to 1921 in the National League. He appeared in the 1917 World Series as a member of the New York Giants.  During his career, in which he appeared in the major leagues in nine consecutive seasons, McCarty was used almost exclusively as a catcher, with the exception of 17 games at first base.  He accumulated 1479 regular season at bats with 393 hits for a .266 batting average with 5 home runs and 138 RBI.

McCarty reached the major leagues with the Brooklyn Superbas, making his debut on August 30, 1913. He would play for Brooklyn until being traded to the Giants for Fred Merkle on August 25, 1916. On July 24, 1920, McCarty was released by the Giants and claimed on waivers by the St. Louis Cardinals soon after, where he would finish his major league career.

In his lone World Series appearance, in 1917 with the Giants, McCarty had two hits in five at bats, including a triple and an RBI against the White Sox.

References

External links

1888 births
1930 deaths
Major League Baseball catchers
Brooklyn Superbas players
Brooklyn Robins players
St. Louis Cardinals players
New York Giants (NL) players
Baseball players from Pennsylvania
Durham Bulls managers
Newark Indians players
Kansas City Blues (baseball) players
Roswell Giants players
Baltimore Orioles (IL) players
Reading Keystones players
Durham Bulls players
Richmond Colts players